The Bazar de l'Hôtel de Ville or Le BHV Marais is a French department store chain with its flagship location at 52 Rue de Rivoli in the 4th arrondissement of Paris and faces the Hôtel de Ville where it gets its name, the flagship is served by the Hôtel de Ville Metro station. The chain is part of Group Galleries Lafayette. The chain operates two full line stores and 4 specialised stores alongside the main stores. The chain was a member of the International Association of Department Stores from 1963-1993.

History

1852-1990: Founding and expansion 
Xavier Ruel and his wife moved to Paris in 1852 and Ruel started selling small items from carts around Paris and with the area around the Hôtel de Ville (Paris City Hall) being the area that earned the most he decided to open a store in the area and rented out the ground floor of a building on Rue de Rivoli and opened "Bazar Parisien".

According to legend in, in 1855, Ruel saved the life of Empress Eugénie (wife of Napoleon III), her horses had become frightened after passing outside the store and Xavier ran out and calmed down the horses to reward him in saving her life she gave him a sum of money which allowed him to expand the store and in 1856 it was renamed to Bazar Napoléon. In 1866 Xavier rented out 3 floors of 54 Rue de Rivoli after a boost in trading.

By 1870, Bazar Napoléon occupied all of the stores building on Rue de Rivoli. After the fall of the Second French Empire the store was renamed to "Bazar de l'Hôtel de Ville" referencing Hôtel de Ville across the street.

In 1900 at 78 years old founder Xavier Ruel died, at the time the business employed 800 people and recorded a capital of 12 million francs.

The store underwent several renovations between 1903-1904 and again in 1912-1913 this redesign was done by architect Auguste Roy.

In 1963, the first branch of the store opened and overtime several BHV stores opened across France but all except the one at Parly 2 are now closed.

In 1963, the company opens its first branch store. Over time, several other BHV department stores are opened in Paris region but most of them are closed nowadays.

1991-2022: Purchase by Galeries Lafayette and rebranding 
In 1991 Galeries Lafayette bought BHV.

In 1998 BHV partnered with ADMIC and opened a store in Beirut, Lebanon.

In 2007-2008, the BHV expands its store with new specialized stores, in the same neighborhood.

In 2012, the store management announced further modifications to its structure, with renovation on each floor, to give a renewal aspect to the store. Paul Delaoutre, CEO of the branch department stores of the Galeries Lafayette group explained that they “aimed at targeting creative urban inhabitants looking for originality”. This is the reason why they decided to “reinvent” the BHV. This also implied a new name which is no longer the BHV but the BHV Marais and a new logo.

In March 2017 a brand new store opened at City Walk in Dubai, UAE the store was 6,000 square metres and opened in partnership with ADMIC who also partnered with BHV to operate the store in Beirut.

In 2020 BHV Lebanon which had been open since 1998 was closed down and rebranded to Home Deco & More.

2023-Present: Possible sale 
It was announced in February 2023 that Groupe Galeries Lafayette had entered negotiations to sell off BHV to Société des grands magasins which operate a number of malls in France and seven Galeries Lafayette stores, the acquisition is scheduled to be completed by late 2023.

Stores

Marais Store 
The flagship Marais store is 38,000 square metres and is spread across 8 different floors with many different departments.

Marais Layout
Basement: Bricolage, Paints & Drugstore
Ground: Home, Beauty, Perfumes, Jewellery & Accessories
First: Women's Fashion & Women's Shoes
Second: Bookshop, Stationary, Hobbies & Luggage
Third: Culinary, Tableware, Appliances, Delicatessen & Glassware
Fourth: Decoration, Lighting, Candles & Furniture
Fifth: Children's Clothing, Children's Shoes, Toys & Lingerie 
Sixth: Bedding & Bathroom
Seventh: Le Perchoir Restaurant
Eighth/Rooftop: Urban Farm

Parly 2 Store 
The location at Parly 2 opened on the 4th of November, 1969 and has 3 floors. In 2017 BHV spent €24 Million on renovating the store.

References

Shops in Paris
Department stores of France
Buildings and structures in the 4th arrondissement of Paris